1982–83 Albanian Cup was the thirty-first season of Albania's annual cup competition. It began in August 1982 with the First Round and ended in February 1983 with the Final match. The winners of the competition qualified for the 1983-84 first round of the UEFA Cup. Dinamo Tirana were the defending champions, having won their tenth Albanian Cup last season. The cup was won by 17 Nëntori.

The rounds were played in a two-legged format similar to those of European competitions. If the aggregated score was tied after both games, the team with the higher number of away goals advanced. If the number of away goals was equal in both games, the match was decided by extra time and a penalty shootout, if necessary.

First round
Games were played on August & September 1982*

 Results unknown

Second round
All sixteen teams of the 1981–82 Superliga and First Division entered in this round. First and second legs were played in January 1983.

|}

Quarter-finals
In this round entered the 8 winners from the previous round.

|}

Semi-finals
In this round entered the four winners from the previous round.

|}

Final

References

 Calcio Mondiale Web

External links
 Official website 

Cup
1982–83 domestic association football cups
1982-83